Audience measurement measures how many people are in an audience, usually in relation to radio listenership and television viewership, but also in relation to newspaper and magazine readership and, increasingly, web traffic on websites. Sometimes, the term is used as pertaining to practices which help broadcasters and advertisers determine who is listening rather than just how many people are listening. In some parts of the world, the resulting relative numbers are referred to as audience share, while in other places the broader term market share is used. This broader meaning is also called audience research.

Measurements are broken down by media market, which for the most part corresponds to metropolitan areas, both large and small.

Methods

Diaries
The diary was one of the first methods of recording information.  However, this is prone to mistakes and forgetfulness, as well as subjectivity.  Data is also collected down to the level of listener opinion of individual songs, cross referenced against their age, race, and economic status in listening sessions sponsored by oldies and mix formatted stations. IBOPE was the first realtime service for audience measurement of the world, it started in São Paulo in 1942.

Electronic

The audience measurement of U.S. television has relied on sampling to obtain estimated audience sizes in which advertisers determine the value of such acquisitions.  According to The Television Will Be Revolutionized, Amanda D. Lotz states that during the 1960s and 1970s, Nielsen introduced the Storage Instantaneous Audimeter, a device that daily sent viewing information to the company's computers using phone lines and made national daily ratings available by 1973.  Although the audimeters did not supply sufficient information regarding demographics of the audience, it did allow Nielsen to establish diary reports that presented some insight on the audience.  According to Lotz, the Nielsen sample included approximately 1,700 audimeter homes and a rotating panel of approximately 850 diary respondents.  Nielsen was the controlling factor of audience measurement for national network television.

In the mid-2000s, networks cried foul, blaming Nielsen for inaccurate rating measurements. This public attention was just the beginning, as Nielsen implemented its automated Local People Meter (LPM) technology. The LPM marked the shift from active, diary based local measurement to more passive, meter-monitored measurement of local markets. Technologically, the LPM is very similar to the original Nielsen People Meter. The key advancement was that the LPM provided accurate measurements of particular local markets. The LPM system has also allowed the industry to measure year-round, rather than the quarterly "sweeps" periods. Researchers believed that the LPM more accurately reported the full range of programming viewers watched, including that while channel-surfing. Arbitron's Portable People Meter uses a microphone to pick up and record subaudible tones embedded in broadcasts by an encoder at each station or network.  It has even been used to track in-store radio.

The introduction of the digital terrestrial television (DTT) around the world brings new problems to the television audience measurement process. In a multisignal context, with the emergence of new contents and squarely in front of the contemporary technological convergence, the correct representation of the viewing behaviors faces methodological challenges. New methodologies (Audio or Video Matching, Water Marketing) are needed in order to measure the digital television audiences. The measurement using audimeters enters a new era, facing the dual challenge of analog and digital measurement in a mixed television broadcast.

Because of the internet, many businesses can easily sell outside their local markets, as they can serve customers across much larger territories.  This development helps them to offer low-occurrence niche items that would face challenges in finding customers their specific market area.  In his Journal of Advertising Research, author Chris Anderson remarks: "for some internet-based businesses, locality no longer regulates the market."  Offered wider choices, consumers award fewer of their "votes" to the big hits and more to specialized niche choices.  Anderson argues that people always wanted more choices, but their desires previously were obscured by distributional bottlenecks imposed by cost or locality.

Software
New digital technologies initially complicated in-home measurement systems. The DVR, for example, initially seemed incompatible with a Nielsen box, which was designed to register the frequency of the television signal in order to measure the channel being viewed. As a DVR always produces the same frequency, an A/P or active/passive meter could be developed to read audio tracks of a particular program rather than the frequency of the television.
Another challenge to the industry was consumers' turning to digital cable, the internet and devices other than their television sets to view entertainment content. As new ways of measurement were becoming readily available and people could easily be tracked and monitored for content and use, the industry worried that traditional sampling techniques might become obsolete. Furthermore, the increasing fragmentation of viewing across different technologies posed difficulties in reporting actual viewer numbers for a content piece. In 2010 Nielsen began rolling out its "anytime anywhere media measurement" initiative, which includes DVR views in the television figures. Dubbed “GTAM,” which stands for Global Television Audience Metering, is based on the development of new audience metering technologies aimed at dealing with all of the conceivable challenges involved in measuring the video viewing behavior of contemporary consumer households across multiple platforms (TV, Internet, mobile devices). Existing A/P meters will be replaced by so-called GTAM meters which are expected to utilize a combination of active and passive measurement technologies. However, unlike A/P meters, they will not require a physical connection to any media devices to function.

The wiki engine software MediaWiki can be equipped with the HitCounters extension as a form of audience measurement and determining the wikiFactor, a rough measurement of a Wiki web site's popularity. 

With the increased popularity of webinars and large video conference sessions e.g. due to the remote work requirements during the COVID-19 pandemic, a new set of direct and anonymous audience engagement tools, such as Mentimeter and Actymeter became popular. These micro audience measurement tools allow anonymous surveys with immediately displaying results.

New media
Nielsen//NetRatings measures Internet and digital media audiences through a telephone and Internet survey. Nielsen BuzzMetrics measures consumer-generated media. Other companies collecting information on internet usage include comScore, Wakoopa, and Hitwise, who measure hits on internet pages. Companies like Visible Measures focus on measuring specific types of media; in the case of Visible Measures, they measure online video consumption and distribution across all video advertising and content. GfK offers Cross Media Measurement Solutions that allows to attribute offline sales to media exposure across TV, Internet and Mobile utilizing its proprietary LEOtrace technology.

Sightcorp, TruMedia, Quividi, relEYEble, stickyPiXEL, Cognitec, goCount and CognoVision provide real-time audience data including size, attention span and demographics by using video analytics technology to automatically detect, track and classify viewers watching digital displays. Networked Insights measures online audiences, and released a report ranking television shows, based on people's interactions within social media. The study showed that half of the shows on Networked Insights' top 10 list did not appear on the Nielsen Media Research (NMR) list.

According to "The Television Will Be Revolutionized" by Amanda D. Lotz, one of the most challenging aspects of audience measurement during the multi-channel transition resulted from the intermediary nature of new technologies and distribution systems. The sampling techniques that most audience research relied upon were based on a fairly uniform nationwide availability of technologies and programming, and thus reflected a network-era experience with television. The arrival of varied programming tiers of cable channels challenged the system as US television homes began having highly descriptive access to technology and programming and consequently began using television in significantly different ways. Although the A/P meter solved the problem of DVR use, programming on video on demand systems did not include the "audio watermark" used by the device. The nation's many cable providers also limited access to the proprietary data recorded by their set top boxes, which reduced the informational gain offered by this technology. Video on demand desperately needed to establish measurement matrices to prove its economic viability, but the lack of shared and consistent information further confounded knowledge about use. Likewise, the erosion of the thirty- second advertisement's dominance and the new advertising strategies that became increasingly common required the creation of new methods and matrices to determine value and pricing.

The goal of these leading providers in automated audience measurement solutions is to deliver results to inquiries such as: The nature of the audience, the number of viewers, the content viewed, the amount of time spent on viewing, the type of display utilized and the audience interest in those displays. In "The Television Will be Revolutionized", Amanda Lotz clearly indicates how technological development in the audience measurement practice provides a multitude of technological advancements such as the DVR, Video-On-Demand portable devices such as the iPod and even a boost in mobile phone proficiencies. These improvements comply with television viewing not to be restrained to be "home-watched". Internet measurement is taken to the next level through its sophistication and high tech distribution. This allows several audiences measurement companies to refer to the Internet as the most measurable media.

Demographics

The demographic of a particular show's audience is also measured. This is often notated in an abbreviated form, e.g.:

 P2+    = Persons aged 2 or more
 P12–34 = Persons aged 12 to 34
 P18–49 = Persons aged 18 to 49
 A18–34 = Adults aged 18 to 34
 Men 18–34
 Women 18–34

Ratings point

Ratings point is a measure of viewership of a particular television programme.

One single television ratings point (Rtg or TVR) represents 1% of television households in the surveyed area in a given minute. As of 2004, there are an estimated 109.6 million television households in the United States. Thus, a single national ratings point represents 1%, or 1,096,000 television households for the 2004–05 season. When used for the broadcast of a program, the average rating across the duration of the show is typically given. Ratings points are often used for specific demographics rather than just households. For example, a ratings point among the key 18- to 49-year-olds demographic is equivalent to 1% of all 18- to 49-year-olds in the country.

A Rtg/TVR is different from a share point in that it is the percentage of all possible households, while a share point is 1% of all households watching television at the time. Hence the share of a broadcast is often significantly higher than the rating, especially at times when overall TV viewing is low. A low TRP can have an adverse effect on a TV program eventually leading to its closure.

GRPs/TRPs
Gross rating points (GRPs) or target rating points (TRPs) are chiefly used to measure the performance of TV-based advertising campaigns, and are the sum of the TVRs of each commercial spot within the campaign. An ad campaign might require a certain number of GRPs among a particular demographic across the duration of the campaign. The GRP of a campaign is equal to the percentage of people who saw, multiplied by the average number of spots that these viewers saw.  Targeted Rating Points are a refinement of GRPs to express the reach time frequency of only the most likely prospects. For example, if a campaign buys 150 GRPs for a television spot, but only half of that audience is actually in the market for the campaign's product, then the TRP would be stated as 75 to calculate the net effective buy .

Gross rating point, a standard measure in advertising, it measures advertising impact. It is a percent of the target market reached multiplied by the exposure frequency. Thus, a program which advertises to 30% of the target market and gives them 4 exposures, will have 120 GRP.

GRPs as a measure has some limitations. People like to think of it as a measure of impact, but that is really overstated. Impact should measure sales; this measures exposures, which is in fact assumed not actual exposures.

 Basics of TAM (television advertising measurement):

Universe: Universe is the total or actual number of people in a defined target audience.

Reach: Reach is the number of individuals from the universe who are exposed to the medium or vehicle.

Reach is normally expressed in terms of % (percentages)

 Calculation of reach:

If universe is: 1,000,000 individuals (this is approx. data, it is usually defined through sampling through people-meter):

For a single episode of a program (30 minutes or 1 hour)
If out of above 1,000,000 of individuals 600,000 saw at least 1 minute of programme then:

Reach = (600,000/1,000,000) x 100

Reach = 60%

Variations of the reach concept:

Gross reach
Gross reach is the summation of all audiences who have been exposed to the vehicle.
 Week 1: 1,000
 Week 2: 2,000
 Week 3: 1,500
 Week 4: 1,200
 Hence, gross reach = Week 1 + Week 2 + Week 3 + Week 4
 Gross reach = 5,700

Cumulative reach

Cumulative reach: The audiences accumulate over the time
 The number of individuals within the TG who are exposed to the medium or vehicle over a certain period of time
 Total time = Total average minutes (universe) x Universe
 Total time/reach = Avg minutes viewers
 Net reach

Net reach Net reach is the summation of all audiences who have been exposed to the vehicle and excludes the duplication of the viewership.

 What is a TVR (television rating point):
TVR = Reach x Time spent

TVR = (minutes viewed/minutes available) + (minutes viewed / minutes available) /N  X100

N = Number of individuals

 Gross rating points (GRPs)
The sum of all ratings achieved in a campaign
GRP levels are generally measured and reported on a 4-week basis
It is a measure of the media plan's trust

 CPRP
Measurement used in planning a television media buy based on the cost of a commercial time slot and the rating of the program where the time slot is positioned. If, for example, the cost of a commercial time slot during prime time was 1000 and the program rating for that time was 10 (which means that 10% of the total potential audience was tuned to that program), then the cost per GRP would be 1000 divided by 10%, or 100. The CPRP measurement is a way of measuring the efficiency of media cost, as compared to measuring the cost per thousand (CPT) and is generally used when making comparisons of the various broadcast vehicles. When the actual buy is made, the advertiser will still want to know the cost of reaching people on a cost-per-thousand basis.

CPRP = 2,491 (i.e., Total amt/Total GRPs)

Terminology
The ratings industry breaks their statistics down in several ways, to express different measurements:

Share
The Share is the percentage of radio listeners tuned into a given station at a given time. For example – a "1.4 Share" means that 1.4% of all people listening to the radio at a specified time are tuned into the specified station or program.

Rating
Rating is the percentage of potential audience members – whether tuned into any program or not – who are tuned into a particular program or station at a given time.

Cume
Cume or Cumulative Audience is the number of unique people tuned into a program or station at a given time. Cume is usually expressed as the estimated number of listeners in any given quarter-hour.

Average Quarter Hour (AQH)

The AQH figure is the average number of audience members during a typical quarter-hour (measured as quarters of the hour from :00 to :15, :15 to :30, :30 to :45, and :45 after the hour to the top of the hour, respectively.

Time Spent Listening (TSL)
The amount of time an average listener spends listening to the station or program before channel surfing. This measurement drives both the frequency of radio commercial breaks, as well as the station's programming strategy.  Stations whose radio formats tend to have short TSLs (music stations) as well as dayparts (see below) with short TSLs (morning drive time, for example) will have more frequent commercial breaks; formats and times with longer TSLs will schedule breaks less frequently.

Demographics
All of the other ratings are broken down by demographics. Stations that might have weak overall ("12+") demographics may have strong enough ratings within a given, desired "demographic" to be attractive to advertisers, and thus profitable.

For example, talk radio stations frequently have lower-than-average "12+" ratings, but much higher numbers among males age 35-54.  Since the 35-54 male demographic is highly coveted by advertisers, such a station can be quite profitable.

Dayparts

In addition to demographics, a key breakdown in ratings is the "Daypart", or segment of the broadcast day.

In radio (and to a lesser extent television), the key dayparts are:
 Morning Drive: characterized by short TSLs (the time a person spends in their car) and, for the well-programmed station, high cumes, Morning Drive (usually from 5AM to around 9AM) is a key revenue generator.
 Mid-Mornings, Mid-Days: With lower listenership (measured by lower average quarter hours) but generally longer TSLs, the middle of the day is a place where stations frequently experiment with longer music, television programming, and longer television commercial sets.
 Afternoon Drive: Again, high listenership but short TSL, combined with a more-tired listenership that is driving home from work, combines to make afternoon drive time (usually from 3PM to 7PM) a time of short sweeps and, in talk radio, brief conversational snips.
 Evenings and Overnights: Lower listenership means lower revenues – but a standout program frequently can draw a niche audience that, if it shows up in the ratings book, can mean solid revenue.

Criticisms

There have been many criticisms of audience measurement. These criticisms tend to refer to methodological problems, sampling issues and reporting issues.

A major issue for media owners and advertisers is that the standard audience surveys only collect data on audience size and basic demographic composition. Audience quality is inferred from the demographic profile of an audience. However, current metrics fail to capture audience engagement. Increasingly advertisers are demanding better measures of media engagement.

In the 1990s, audience research methods generally were thrown into question with the arrival of new media, especially digital media and changes to the public's media habits. People meters, which recorded the household's viewing by noting the station to which a TV was tuned, failed to capture new viewing habits such as recording programs for playback at a later time or watching a podcast / download on another device such as a tablet or computer. The proliferation of new media has given consumers much greater control over where and when they access content. For instance, Video on Demand (VoD) enables consumers to decide when to watch programs while smartphones enable consumers to decide where to access content.<ref>Webster, J., Phalen, P. and Lichty, L., "'Ratings Analysis: Audience Measurement and Analytics,  New York, Routledge, 2014, p. 35</ref> Media research companies have been forced to devise new methodologies capable of tracking new and unprecedented viewing habits across a diverse range of different platforms.

Another issue which has presented challenges for media measurement is the consumer habit of simultaneous media consumption. Modern audiences are often consuming multiple media at the same time. For example, a teenager might be plugged into radio via earphones while working on the Internet, where he or she is scanning online newspapers and magazines. Thus the user may be consuming three or more media alternatives at the same time. Media research companies, which historically specialised in a single media such as radio or TV, were poorly equipped to respond to the challenge of simultaneous consumption across multiple platforms. However, media research is slowly devising methods designed to capture simultaneous media consumption habits.

The timing of audience reports is a major issue for both the networks and advertisers. Data collected by people-meters is available on the morning after programs have aired. However, data collected by diary methods requires much more time to collate and analyse. Radio surveys, for example, which are still used for radio ratings in many countries, are normally only available on a quarterly basis. The time lag in reporting fails to provide advertisers with sufficient lead times to take corrective action during a campaign.

Other questions have been raised about diary-based data collection methods. The expectation that diarists participating in the radio sample will accurately record their listening at 15-minute intervals has been challenged by many analysts. Many analysts suspect that diarists only fill in their diaries at the end of each week, or perhaps less often which forces them to recall their radio usage thereby raising concerns about reliability. In addition the diary based method appears to inflate average audience size, because the total audience is captured by recording any person who was listening during a quarter-hour counts as listening for the entire duration, even if the actual time was just for a minute or two.

The process of surveying listeners for their preferences has also been criticised for its lack of flexibility. Listeners complain that modern radio lacks variety and depth but the measurement methods only facilitate further refinement of already minutely programmed formats rather than the overhaul that many listeners are asking for. Radio in the US, is where listeners hear their old favorites rather than are exposed to new music. Data obtained by some audience measurement methods is detailed to individual songs and how they are reacted to by each age, racial, and economic group the station is seeking to attract. This statistical approach leads to highly recognizable songs (such as those from the Beatles) which score well with a cross-section of listeners.

Measurement conferences
The world's largest audience measurement conference, AM X.0, is presented annually by the Advertising Research Foundation. Each year, hundreds of attendees from around the world gather to hear a collection of experts speak on Social Media, Mobile and Cross-Platform issues.

Measurement companies

In most countries the advertising industry, via its peak industry associations, endorses a single media research company as the official provider of audience measurement. The methodology used by the official provider then becomes known as the industry currency'' in audience measurement. Industry members fund the audience research and share the findings. In a few countries, where the industry is more fragmented or where there is no clear peak industry association, two or more competing organisations may provide audience measurement services. In such countries, there is said to be no industry currency.

Four basic methods of data collection are used to survey broadcast audiences, namely  interviews, diaries, meters or scanning and modelling. Research companies employ different methodologies depending on where  and  when  media is  used  and  the cost of data collection. All these methods involve  sampling – that is taking a representative sample of the population and recording their media usage which is then extrapolated to the general population.

The Kantar Media network (including TNS) currently measures TV, radio, and internet audiences in over 40 countries. Nielsen Media Research is also very active in the provision of radio survey data globally, collecting  TV audience measures in 27 countries, people meter technology in more than 58,000 homes. GfK, a global market research company, provides similar Media Measurement services in Europe and other parts of the world.

 In Australia, television ratings are collected by three main organizations. OzTAM serves metropolitan areas, Regional TAM serves regional areas serviced by three commercial networks. Ratings are collected year round, but findings are not made public for a period of around 10 weeks over summer which allows the networks to experiment with schedules.  Radio surveys are carried out by  Nielsen Media Research Australia.
 In Israel, MBER provide Radio and TV measurement rating.
 In Argentina, radio and television measurement is done by Ibope and Infortecnica.
 In Armenia, television ratings are collected by Admosphere-Armenia CJSC.
 In Austria the measurement is done by GfK at the request of Verein Arbeitsgemeinschaft TELETEST (AGTT).
 In Belgium TV and radio measurements are handled by GfK at the request of Centrum voor Informatie over de Media (CIM).
 In Bosnia and Herzegovina, Mareco Index Bosnia is the provider of TAM ratings (TV Meters). This company also provides Radio & Print Measurement data (Diary).
 In Brazil, IBOPE provide measurement services for TV.
 The provider of Bulgarian TAM ratings is Taylor Nelson Sofres TV PLAN; this company uses TV meters.
 In Canada, Numeris measures both TV and radio while its subsidiary NLogic is one of several companies that provide software for analyzing the data.
 In Colombia, television measurement is done by IBOPE and Nielsen. In Radio, measurements are handled by ECAR
 Finnpanel measures both radio and TV in Finland.
 In Czech Republic, television ratings are collected by Mediaresearch.
 In Denmark, radio measurement is handled by TNS Gallup.
 In France, radio and television measurement is handled by Médiamétrie. Newspaper readership is handled by EPIQ.
 In Germany TV audience measurement is done by Gesellschaft für Konsumforschung (known as GfK).
 In Greece television measurement is done by AGB Hellas (Nielsen Audience Measurement).
 In India, television ratings are collected by Broadcast Audience Research Council (BARC) India. Broadcast Audience Research Council (BARC) India is a joint-industry not-for-profit body that publishes weekly TV viewership data for India. It is mandated to design, commission, supervise, and own a television audience measurement system for India, and provides Indian broadcast sector with a real-time television rating points (TRP) measurement system. BARC India was set up by the three key stakeholder bodies in Indian broadcast sector - the India Broadcast Foundation (IBF), Advertising Agencies Association of India (AAAI) and Indian Society of Advertisers (ISA). It uses Audio Watermarking technology to measure viewership of TV channels, and the system also allows measurement of time-shifted viewing and simulcasts. The company was incorporated in 2010 and is based in Mumbai, India. For Radio Audience Measurement, TAM Media Research and IRAM (Indian Radio Audience Measurement) holds country wide telephonic surveys.
 In Japan, Video Research Ltd. handles radio and television measurement. IRS (Indian Readership Survey) is the industry currency for newspaper and magazine readership.
 In Kazakhstan, TV measurement is handled by TNS.
 In the Kingdom of Saudi Arabia the measurement is done by GfK at the request of Saudi Media Measurement Company (SMMC).
 In Lithuania, TV and radio measurements are handled by TNS Gallup.
 In Malaysia, no single, official currency for measuring TV audiences and two competing companies provide data, using different methodologies, namely GfK Malaysia and Kantar Media; radio surveys are carried out by GfK Malaysia.
 In the Netherlands Press, TV and radio measurements are handled by GfK.
 In New Zealand GfK measures radio audiences, while ACB McNair measures TV audiences.
 In the Philippines, TV measurement is handled by Kantar Media Philippines and AGB Nielsen Media Research Philippines. Kantar Media uses a nationwide panel size of 2,609 urban and rural homes that represent 100% of the total Philippine TV viewing population, while AGB Nielsen reportedly has only 1,980 homes based solely in urban areas that represent only 57% of the Philippine TV viewing population. Kantar Media covers 15.135 million households or 75 million individuals while AGB only covers 7.260 million households or 34.4 million individuals. Radio measurement is handled by AGB Nielsen, Kantar Media Philippines (upon the request of the Kapisanan ng mga Brodkaster ng Pilipinas (KBP, Association of Broadcasters of the Philippines) and Radio Research Council (RRC)), and the Philippine Survey and Research Center (PSRC). Print measurement is handled by AGB Nielsen, TNS, and Strategic Consumer and Media Incites Inc. (SCMI).
 In Pakistan TV audience measurement is done by Gallup BRB & Medialogic Pakistan.
 In Portugal TV audience measurement is done by GfK.
 In Poland TV audience measurement is done by Nielsen Audience Measurement. Internet audience measurement is done by Gemius.
 In Russia TV, Radio, Press and Internet measurements are handled by TNS Gallup, OOH is measured by ESPAR Analytics in cooperation with TNS Gallup, Digital Signage is measured by gocount.net.
 In Singapore the measurement is done by GfK at the request of Infocomm Media Development Authority (IMDA).
 In Slovakia TV audience measurement is done by TNS.
 In South Korea, television measurement is handled by AGB Nielsen (formerly Media Service Korea) and TNmS Media (formerly TNS Korea). AGB Nielsen also handles internet content measurement with the help of CJ E&M's Smart Media division.
 In Spain, digital signage audience measurement is done by aiTech. Radio and television measurement is done by Infortecnica.
 In South Africa  TNS collects radio survey data while Nielsen Media collects data for television audiences
 In Sweden TV audience measurement is done by MMS — Mediamätning i Skandinavien.
 In Turkey, TV measurement is done by TNS (Kantar Media), radio by Nielsen.
 In the UK, television measurement is administered by the Broadcasters' Audience Research Board via a metered panel and radio by RAJAR, using a diary system. The NRS (National Readership Survey) measures newspaper and magazine readership.
 In the United States, TV and radio measurement is carried out Nielsen Media Research (the radio component was formerly carried out by Arbitron), and digital signage by TruMedia and CognoVision. Stratacache uses audience measurement technology to build reports for digital signage. 
 In Vietnam, TV measurement is done by VIETNAM-TAM (co-operoratiaon of MIC & Nielsen & AMI), Kantar Media also carry out measure TV audience since 1995.

See also

 Internet radio audience measurement
 List of most-watched television broadcasts

References 
Lotz, Amanda D. (2007) "The Television Will Be Revolutionized". New York. NY: New York University Press. p. 196-197
Lotz, Amanda D. (2007) "The Television Will Be Revolutionized". New York. NY: New York University Press. p. 199

 
Broadcasting
Market research
Promotion and marketing communications